Edward Ernest Butcher (7 April 1885 – 8 June 1965) was a British actor, on stage from 1935, and with many film and TV appearances. He was the second husband of the actress Muriel George, and stepfather to her son, the critic John Davenport.

He appeared in the original production of J.B. Priestley's play When We Are Married at St. Martin's Theatre London, in 1938; and reprised his performance in the film version, in 1943.

Selected filmography
 Key to Harmony (1935)
 The Small Man (1936)
 Talking Feet (1937)
 The Song of the Road (1937)
 Stepping Toes (1938)
 Me and My Pal (1939)
 Black Eyes (1939)
 Pack Up Your Troubles (1940)
 Freedom Radio (1941)
 Old Mother Riley in Business (1941)
 'Pimpernel' Smith (1941)
 When We Are Married (1943)
 Candles at Nine (1944)
 It's in the Bag (1944)
 Tawny Pipit (1944)
 It Happened One Sunday (1944)
 The Years Between (1946)
 Easy Money (1948)
 My Brother Jonathan (1948)
 My Brother's Keeper (1948)
 For Them That Trespass (1949)
 Diamond City (1949)
 Meet Simon Cherry (1949)
 Night and the City (1950)
 No Trace (1950)
 Blackout (1950)
 Highly Dangerous (1950)
 The Happy Family (1952)
 Time Bomb (1953)
 Background (1953)
 The Desperate Man (1959)

References
appeared in Terror on a Train, 1953, with Glenn Ford as seen on cable station TCM at10:45 - 12:15pm EST on 8/22/2017

External links

1885 births
1965 deaths
English male stage actors
English male film actors
English male television actors
People from Burnley
Male actors from Lancashire
20th-century English male actors